Justine Waddell (born 4 November 1975) is a South African-British former actress.  She played roles in the 2006 film The Fall and 2005 film Chaos as well as Tess in the 1998 LWT adaptation of Tess of the d'Urbervilles and Estella in the 1999 BBC adaptation of Great Expectations.

Early life 
Waddell was born in Johannesburg, South Africa. Her father, Gordon Waddell (1937–2012), was a Scottish rugby union player who captained the Scottish national team and played for the British and Irish Lions. He later became a Progressive Party Member of Parliament in South Africa, and a director of Anglo American PLC. Her grandfather, Herbert Waddell (1902–1988), also played rugby for Scotland and the Lions. Waddell moved with her family to Scotland when she was eleven. Four years later they moved to London. Waddell is the only member of her family to take up a career in acting. She read Social and Political Science at Emmanuel College, Cambridge, which allowed her to take time off from her studies to pursue her career.

Career 

Waddell has divided her work between stage and screen. Amongst her roles to date have been her performance as Sasha opposite Ralph Fiennes and Bill Paterson in the Almeida Theatre's London production of Ivanov (1997), Countess Nordston in Anna Karenina (1997), Tess in a London Weekend Television production of Tess of the D'Urbervilles (1998), Julia Bertram in Mansfield Park (1999), Estella in Great Expectations, Nina in a Royal Shakespeare Company production of The Seagull by Anton Chekhov (2000), for which she was nominated for an Ian Charleson award and Molly Gibson in the television mini series Wives and Daughters for which she won a Broadcasting Press Guild Best Actress award. She played Mary Heller in the American film, Dracula 2000.  In 2002 she starred in The One and Only. She won a Prism Award for Best Actress for her portrayal of Natalie Wood in The Mystery of Natalie Wood, a 2004 TV movie directed by Peter Bogdanovich. In 2006 Waddell starred alongside Jason Statham and Ryan Phillipe in Chaos. During the same year, she co-starred with Lee Pace in Tarsem Singh’s The Fall. 

In 2011 Waddell had a starring role in Mishen, which is a Russian science fiction film directed by Alexander Zeldovich and written by Vladimir Sorokin. Mishen had its world premiere at the Berlin International Film Festival and then a gala premiere at the Moscow International Film Festival. This would be her last acting role before her retirement. 
In 2014, Waddell was on the jury of the Festival of European Film "Voices" in Vologda, Russia. 

In 2015, she was on the jury of the Eurasia International Film Festival in Kazakhstan alongside jury chairman Abderrahmane Sissako and South Korean film director Kim Dong-ho.  She also took part in the BBC New Year film programme to discuss women in film with Francine Stock, Elizabeth Karlson and Carol Morley.

She is also the founder and director of Kino Klassika Foundation which educates audiences about film and film materials from the countries of the former Soviet Union, and Klassiki streaming platform dedicated to cinema from Russia, the Caucasus and Central Asia.

Filmography

Awards and nominations

References

External links 
 

Living people
1976 births
20th-century South African actresses
21st-century South African actresses
Actresses from Johannesburg
Alumni of Emmanuel College, Cambridge
Scottish film actresses
Scottish stage actresses
Scottish television actresses
Scottish voice actresses
South African emigrants to the United Kingdom
South African film actresses
South African people of Scottish descent